Nizar Shafi is an Indian cinematographer and Film director who works mainly in the Tamil film industry and Telugu cinema. He was critically acclaimed for his work in Sutta Kadhai, Naaigal Jaakirathai, Bhale Bhale Magadivoy and Nenu Local. He debuted as a director with Tamil and Telugu bilingual film 7 (film).

Career
Nizar completed his diploma in cinematography from M.G.R. Government Film and Television Training Institute, Chennai. He assisted Sakthi Saravanan in Saroja and Mankatha, he also worked as an associate cinematographer in Enthiran. His first independent movie as a cinematographer was Sutta Kadhai (2013). His movie Naaigal Jaakirathai (2014) received positive reviews from critics, and was one of the most profitable ventures of 2014. His movie Bhale Bhale Magadivoy (2015) became the fourth-highest grossing Telugu film of all time at the United States box office, where it was released in 115 screens.

Filmography
As cinematographer

References

External links
 

Living people
Tamil film cinematographers
M.G.R. Government Film and Television Training Institute alumni
Indian Tamil people
1989 births
Artists from Chennai
Telugu film cinematographers
Cinematographers from Tamil Nadu